Trombidium fturum is a species of mite in the genus Trombidium in the family Trombidiidae. It is found in Spain and Switzerland.

References
 Synopsis of the described Arachnida of the World: Trombidiidae

Trombidiidae
Animals described in 1951
Arachnids of Europe
Fauna of Switzerland